The Bode Nunataks are two partly snow-covered nunataks lying  north of Mount Harding in the Grove Mountains. Mapped from air photos, 1956–60, by Australian National Antarctic Research Expeditions, they were named by the Antarctic Names Committee of Australia for O. Bode, weather observer at Mawson Station, 1962.

References
 

Nunataks of Princess Elizabeth Land